The schooner USS Eagle was the fourth vessel to bear the name and was one of three ships named USS Eagle during the War of 1812 by the United States. She was purchased by the navy at New Orleans, Louisiana in 1814 and armed with twelve guns.

References

Schooners of the United States Navy
War of 1812 ships of the United States